Harrison E. Mutikanga is a civil engineer, business executive, and academic in Uganda. He is the managing director and the chief executive officer of the Uganda Electricity Generation Company Limited.

Background and education
Mutikanga was born in 1968 to Late George William Rwimo and Joselyne Mary Rwimo of Nyakabingo in Kisoro district, in Kilembe, Kasese District, where Late George Rwimo was employed at the time. He was the second-born, in a family of five boys and one girl.

His first attended Bulembeya Primary School in Kilembe, but while in grade 2, his father developed medical problems and the family relocated to Kisoro District. In Kisoro, he moved around in several elementary schools. He finished his primary schooling from grade 4 to grade 7 at Kabindi primary school.

He attended Mutolere Secondary School in Mutolere, Kisoro, for his O-Level studies. He then transferred to Makerere College School for his A-Level education, where he studied physics, chemistry, and mathematics. He was admitted to Makerere University to study civil engineering, graduating with a Bachelor of Science in civil engineering. He later earned, from a university in the Netherlands, both a Master of Science and a Doctor of Philosophy in civil engineering.

Career
When he left Makerere, he went to work for the National Water and Sewerage Corporation (NWSC) and was posted to Jinja as area manager. He worked for NWSC for 20 years, when an advertisement for UEGCL's chief executive officer appeared in a newspaper. He applied and was selected as the best out of 23 applicants.

At UEGCL, he overseas generation of electricity at the two government-owned power stations of Nalubaale and Kiira. He is also responsible for overseeing the construction of the 183 megawatt Isimba Hydroelectric Power Station and the 600 megawatt Karuma Hydroelectric Power Station.

Other responsibilities
Mutikanga is a married father of four children. He formerly worked as a part-time lecturer at Uganda Christian University in Mukono. He is a member of the Engineers Registration Board of Uganda. He is a board member of Malaria Free Uganda, a Public Private Initiative by Government of Uganda under Ministry of Health charged with creating an enabling environment for private sector participation and stakeholder engagement in Malaria elimination in Uganda by 2030.

See also
 Stephen Isabalija
 Proscovia Margaret Njuki

References

External links
Website of Uganda Electricity Generation Company Limited

Living people
1968 births
Makerere University alumni
People from Kisoro District
People from Western Region, Uganda
People educated at Makerere College School
Academic staff of Uganda Christian University